Collyridini is a tribe of tiger beetles found mostly in Asia.

Genera 
Ground Beetles Of The World lists:
Subtribe Collyridina sensu stricto

 Protocollyris Mandl, 1975
 Neocollyris W.Horn, 1901
 Collyris Fabricius, 1801
Subtribe Tricondylina Naviaux, 1991

 Derocrania Chaudoir, 1861
 Tricondyla Latreille, 1822

References

External links 

Cicindelidae